Anasaitis locuples, also known as the Corythalia locuples, is a brightly colored species of spider within the family Salticidae (jumping spiders), and the Genus Anasaitis. The Anasaitis locuples has a distinct, metallic or iridescent blue cephalothorax, with a golden abdomen.  They have been observed in Hispaniola.

References 

Salticidae
Spiders described in 1888
Spiders of the Caribbean